Christie Ellen Claridge (born November 21, 1962, in Chatsworth, California) is an American model, actress, and beauty queen who was crowned Miss International 1982.

Miss International
Hailing from California and representing the Golden State, Claridge also earned the Miss Photogenic award at the Miss International competition in Fukuoka, Japan. She was the third American winner of the pageant in just a span of nine years.

Acting career
Christie was an actress known for the movies Gotcha! (1985) and Beverly Hills Madam (1986) and guest starred on several television shows during the 1980s, often appearing more than once but as different characters. These included T.J. Hooker, The New Mike Hammer, The Love Boat, Hunter and Airwolf. She guest starred as "Suzy" in seven episodes of Days of Our Lives during 1984. Her last acting role was as a guest in the TV series 1st & Ten in 1988.

Personal life
She is the sister of Linda Hogan, ex-wife of professional wrestler Hulk Hogan. Her father is Joe Claridge, who made the guns Claridge Hi-Tec. Her mother is Gail Claridge, an established interior designer, and owner of Gail Claridge Designs. She currently resides in Northern Los Angeles with her family and now has two children, Scott and Holly Foster.

References

External links

Official Miss International website - Past titleholders

1962 births
Living people
Miss International winners
American beauty pageant winners
Miss International 1982 delegates